Madhugandha Kulkarni (MR: मधुगंधा कुलकर्णी) is an Indian film, theatre and television person.

Career
Madhugandha Kulkarni is an Indian actress and screenwriter. She has done good work in Marathi films. These includes Harishchandrachi Factory, Taptapadi (2014), Elizabeth Ekadashi (2014) and Chi Va Chi Sau Ka (2017).

Personal life 
Kulkarni's childhood was spent in Pandharpur. She is married to Paresh Mokashi.

Work 
 Dialogue, story writer and co-producer of the film Chi Va Chi Sau Ka
 Dialogue, story writer and co-producer of the film Elizabeth Ekadashi, based on her childhood living in Pandharpur.
 Dialogue writer for the film Taptapadi.
 Screenplay co-writer for the film Chi Va Chi Sau Ka.
 Actor in film Pangira.
 Screenplay and dialogues for the television serial Chuk Bhul Dyavi Ghyavi.
 Actor in short film Baangdya.
 Actor in television serial Julun Yeti Reshimgathi.
 Writer of television serial Honar Sun Me Hya Gharchi.
 Writer of plays Tya eka valnavar and Lagnabambal. 
 Actor in plays Eka kalajachi goshta and Lali leela.
 Actor in television serial Tujha Majha Break Up

References 

Marathi actors